Michael Tucker may refer to:
Michael Tucker (actor) (born 1945), (L.A. Law and Hill Street Blues)
Michael Tucker (baseball) (born 1971), Major League Baseball outfielder
Michael Tucker (basketball) (1954–2012), Australian Olympic basketball player
Michael Tucker (director), film director
Michael S. Tucker (born 1954), United States Army general
Mick Tucker (1947–2002), musician in the band The Sweet
Mickey Tucker (born 1941), American jazz pianist
Mike Tucker (special effects artist), special effects expert and writer
Mike Tucker (equestrian) (1944–2018), British equestrian commentator
BloodPop (born 1990), real name Michael Tucker, American musician
Michael Tucker (Chuck), a.k.a. "Big Mike", a fictional character in the television series Chuck
Mike Tucker (The Archers), a fictional character from the British radio soap opera The Archers